The Menthe, occasionally called Menthajangal (Menhdheyangal), are an indigenous Australian people of the Northern Territory.

Country
Along the coast it ran south from Red Cliff down past Cape Scott. Their hinterland extension had a depth of some 10 miles bordering on the coastal swamps in that area.

Notes

Citations

Sources

Aboriginal peoples of the Northern Territory